IC2 may refer to:

IC2, one of the British police's radio IC codes
Intercity 2, railway service by Deutsche Bahn
IC2 (Portugal), see Roads in Portugal
Interdisciplinary Consulting Corporation, an aerospace sensor company in Florida, USA